Anouvong is the capital of Xaisomboun province.

History
Anouvong was named after King Anouvong when Xaisomboun Province was established as the 18th province of Laos on 13 December 2013.

In 2021, Xaisomboun province officials announced the development of Phou Bia Mountain as a "sustainable development tourism site", valued at some US$500 million. The development will center on Phou Houa Xang Village, in Anouvong District, under a 99 year concession.

References

District of Xaisomboun province